Essen-Borbeck is a railway station in Essen, North Rhine-Westphalia, Germany. The station is located on the Essen–Bottrop railway and is served by RE and S-Bahn services operated by NordWestBahn and Abellio Rail NRW .

Train services
Special 15 minutes-tact RE14 / S9 :  Gladbeck - Bottrop - Essen-Borbeck - Essen Hbf

The following services currently call at Essen Borbeck:

Tram service
 103 at 10-minute intervals.

Bus services

It is served by routes 140, 143, 160, 170, 185 and 186 at 20-minute intervals, operated by Ruhrbahn.

References

S9 (Rhine-Ruhr S-Bahn)
Rhine-Ruhr S-Bahn stations
Borbeck
Railway stations in Germany opened in 1862
1862 establishments in Prussia